Term Archbishop of Belgrade may refer to:
 Serbian Orthodox Archbishop of Belgrade, head of Serbian Orthodox Metropolitanate of Belgrade
 Roman Catholic Archbishop of Belgrade, head of Roman Catholic Archdiocese of Belgrade

See also
 Archbishopric of Belgrade (disambiguation)
 Archdiocese of Belgrade (disambiguation)
 Metropolitanate of Belgrade (disambiguation)
 Eastern Orthodoxy in Serbia
 Catholic Church in Serbia
 Belgrade